Marvin Wilmer Colen (March 8, 1915 – May 14, 1989) was an American professional basketball player. He played for the Chicago Bruins (one game) and Sheboygan Red Skins (five games) in the National Basketball League during the 1939–40 season and averaged 1.0 points per game.

References

1915 births
1989 deaths
All-American college men's basketball players
American men's basketball players
Basketball players from Chicago
Chicago Bruins players
Guards (basketball)
Loyola Ramblers men's basketball players
Sheboygan Red Skins players
United States Army personnel of World War II